Malligwad is a village in Dharwad district of Karnataka, India.

Demographics 
As of the 2011 Census of India there were 153 households in Malligwad and a total population of 1,083 consisting of 611 males and 472 females. There were 74 children ages 0–6.

References

Villages in Dharwad district